Capriccio is a 1938 German historical comedy film directed by Karl Ritter and starring Lilian Harvey, Viktor Staal and Paul Kemp. The film is set in 18th century France, where a young woman enjoys a series of romantic adventures. The director, Ritter, was attempting to recreate the style of a René Clair comedy. The film's content was criticised by both Joseph Goebbels and Adolf Hitler. Harvey made only one further film in Germany before leaving for France.

It was shot at the Babelsberg Studios of UFA in Potsdam and premiered at the Gloria-Palast in Berlin. The film's sets were designed by the art director Walter Röhrig.

Selected cast

References

Bibliography 
 
 Klaus, Ulrich J. Deutsche Tonfilme: Jahrgang 1938. Klaus-Archiv, 1988.

External links 
 

1938 films
Films of Nazi Germany
German musical comedy films
German historical comedy films
German black-and-white films
1938 musical comedy films
1930s historical comedy films
1930s German-language films
Films directed by Karl Ritter
Films set in France
Films set in the 18th century
UFA GmbH films
1930s German films
Films shot at Babelsberg Studios